The 1914 Texas Longhorns football team was an American football team that represented the University of Texas as an independent during the 1914 college football season. In their fourth season under head coach Dave Allerdice, the Longhorns compiled an 8–0 record, shut out five of eight opponents, and outscored all opponents by a total of 358 to 21.  

There was no contemporaneous system in 1914 for determining a national champion. However, Texas was retroactively named as the national champion by the Billingsley Report using its alternate "margin of victory" methodology. Other selectors chose Army or Illinois as the national champion.

Guard Louis Jordan was selected by Walter Camp as a second-team player on the 1914 All-America college football team.

Schedule

References

Texas
Texas Longhorns football seasons
College football undefeated seasons
Texas Longhorns football